The legal system of Afghanistan consists of Islamic, statutory and customary rules. It has developed over centuries and is currently changing in the context of the rebuilding of the Afghan state. The supreme law of the land is the Sharia. In addition, there is complex legislation that stems from different historical periods. For instance, the so-called four volumes of civil law were developed on the basis of Egyptian models and promulgated in the time of the monarchy. Other legislation came into force under of President Daoud Khan, the Democratic Republic (1978-1992), the Mujahideen (1992-1996), the first Taliban regime (1996-2001), the Islamic Republic of Afghanistan (2004–2021) and the current Islamic Emirate of Afghanistan. Article 130 of the Afghan Constitution establishes that judges must apply the constitution and legislation and may only resort to Hanafi fiqh (one of the Schools of Islamic Law) if a necessary legal rule cannot be found in the written laws.

Judicial System 

The Judiciary system consists of five major courts:
 The Supreme court: with the highest authority with nine members including the chief appointed by the president and the house of the people per Articles 117 and 118 of the Constitution.
 The court of Appeals: composed of the chief, the heads of Dewans , and other judicial members. Selection is based on experience and qualification. Per Article 31, the head of the General Criminal Dewan commonly serves as deputy head of the Court of Appeals.
 The Primary courts: according to Article 40, primary courts are generally established within the Court of Appeal jurisdictions. New courts can be founded in the centers of provinces, with the approval of the Supreme court president.
 The Juvenile court: this court is part of the primary court of every province and is made up of the head and three judicial members. The fundamental laws of this court follow Article 44.
 The Commercial court: this optional court system can be established within provinces, and composed of the chief and four other judicial members. Per Article 45, commercial cases can be deliberated under Primary court when commercial courts aren’t available.  

Court cases are generally handled at the primary and appeal stages by three major judges. The cessation stage could also be deliberated with two or more participant judges, applying the constitution and laws of the Islamic Republic of Afghanistan.

See also

Law enforcement in Afghanistan
Ministry of Justice (Afghanistan)
Capital punishment in Afghanistan
Justice minister

References